Antoine Joseph Emmanuel Bernède (born 26 May 1999) is a French professional footballer who plays as a midfielder for Swiss club Lausanne-Sport on loan from the Austrian Bundesliga club Red Bull Salzburg.

Club career

Paris Saint-Germain
Bernède made his professional debut for Paris Saint-Germain on 4 August 2018 in the 2018 Trophée des Champions, coming on as a substitute in the 74th minute for Thiago Silva in the 4–0 win against Monaco.

Red Bull Salzburg
On 6 February 2019, Bernède signed with Austrian Bundesliga club Red Bull Salzburg.

On 9 January 2023, Bernède joined Lausanne-Sport in Switzerland on loan with an option to buy.

Personal life
Bernède's mother is Cameroonian and his father is French.

Career statistics

Club

Honours
Paris Saint-Germain
 Ligue 1: 2018–19
 Trophée des Champions: 2018

Red Bull Salzburg
 Austrian Bundesliga: 2018–19, 2019–20, 2020–21, 2021-22
 Austrian Cup:2018–19, 2019–20, 2020–21, 2021-22

References

External links

 
 
 
 
 

1999 births
Footballers from Paris
Black French sportspeople
French sportspeople of Cameroonian descent
Living people
French footballers
France youth international footballers
Association football midfielders
Paris Saint-Germain F.C. players
FC Red Bull Salzburg players
FC Lausanne-Sport players
Ligue 1 players
Austrian Football Bundesliga players
Championnat National 3 players
French expatriate footballers
Expatriate footballers in Austria
French expatriate sportspeople in Austria
Expatriate footballers in Switzerland
French expatriate sportspeople in Switzerland